David Levin may refer to:

David Levin (balloonist) (1948–2017), American balloonist
David Levin (businessman) (born 1963), British businessman
David Levin (ice hockey) (born 1999), Israeli ice hockey player
David Levin (singer), American singer-songwriter
David L. Levin (born 1949), American politician from Missouri
David P. Levin (born 1958), American producer, director, writer and editor
Dave Levin, American professional wrestler

See also
David Levine (disambiguation)